Debelah is the first album by American singer Debelah Morgan. It was released in the United States by Atlantic Records on June 14, 1994.

Atlantic Records released the album in the United States and Japan. It includes two singles: "Take It Easy" and a remake of the Deniece Williams song "Free". Other highlights on the album include Morgan and R&B singer Kenny Harper's remake of Rick James and Teena Marie's 1981 duet "Fire and Desire", and a duet with music producer Troy Taylor.

Track listing

References

External links

1994 debut albums
Debelah Morgan albums
Atlantic Records albums